Boban Rajović (born 25 December 1971) is a Danish-born Montenegrin singer popular in former Yugoslavia. Some of his big hit songs include "Usne boje vina" (Wine-colored Lips) and "Provokacija" (Provocation). He has lived in Belgrade since 2000. He is married to Dragana Rajović and has three children with her.

Private life
Rajović was born in Copenhagen, Denmark, to parents that had migrated (see gastarbeiter) from Berane, SR Montenegro, Yugoslavia. At 19 years of age he started singing in Yugoslav-owned cafés in Scandinavia. His family patron saint (slava) is Saint Basil of Ostrog. He moved to Belgrade, Serbia, in 2000 to record his first album. He remains there.

Discography
Studio albums
Boban (2000)
Puklo srce (My Heart Exploded, 2003)
Provokacija (Provocation, 2006)
Usne boje vina (Lips the Color of Wine, 2007)
Kosači (Mowers, 2008)
Mijenjam (I'm Changing, 2010)

Compilation albums
Najbolje do sada (The Best Until Now, 2009)

As featured artist
Persijska princeza (Princess of Persia, 2009) with Filip Filipi
Mandolins Cry

Non-album singles
Padobran, 2016
Spartanac, 2018

References

External links
Official Website

1971 births
Living people
21st-century Serbian male singers
Danish people of Yugoslav descent
Danish expatriates in Serbia
Serbian people of Montenegrin descent
Musicians from Copenhagen
Serbian turbo-folk singers